List of communities in Digby County, Nova Scotia

Communities are ordered by the highway upon which they are located.  All routes start with the terminus located near the largest community.

Trunk Routes

Trunk 1: Smith's Cove - Weymouth North - Weymouth - New Edinburgh - Belliveaus Cove - Church Point - Little Brook - Comeauville - Saulnierville - Meteghan River - Meteghan - St. Alphonse de Clare - Mavillette - Salmon River - Beaver River

Arterial Highways

Highway 101: Brighton - Barton - Plympton - Gilberts Cove - Marshalltown

Collector Roads

Route 217: Digby - Rossway - Waterford -Lake Midway - Sandy Cove - Mink Cove - Little River - Tiddville - East Ferry - Tiverton - Central Grove - Freeport - Westport
Route 340: Ohio - Weaver Settlement - Hassett - Havelock - Hilltown - New Tusket - Corberrie - Moody's Corner - Richfield

Communities located on rural roads

Acaciaville
Bangor
Bear Cove
Bear River
Cape St. Marys
Concession
Culloden
Danvers
Doucetteville
Gullivers Cove
 Hainsfield
Hectanooga
Hillgrove
Maxwellton Station
Meteghan Station
Morganville
New Edinburgh
New France
North Range
Plympton Station
Riverdale
Sissiboo Falls
South Range
Southville
St. Joseph
St. Martin de Clare
Weymouth
Weymouth Falls

See also

Digby County, Nova Scotia

Geography of Digby County, Nova Scotia